CrossCrypt is an open-source on-the-fly encryption program for the Microsoft Windows XP/2000 operating systems.  CrossCrypt allows a user to make virtual drives which encrypt any files stored on them, making the encryption process seamless to the user.

CrossCrypt is based on FileDisk, virtual disk driver for Windows NT/2000/XP that uses one or more files to emulate physical disks, adding encrypted volumes functionality.

Features

Application operates on .IMG file format disk images.

The format of CrossCrypt container files is fully compatible with one of the older Linux loop-AES device formats., they can be used under both Windows and Linux.

Although a GUI has been created for CrossCrypt (i.e. CrossCryptGUI), CrossCrypt on its own operates without a GUI using a command line interface. One advantage being its small size; as it's composed of only a single driver in *.sys format (43 Kb) and one command line or GUI executable (*.exe) (96 Kb). It does not have any installer.

CD/DVD encryption

The application is capable of encrypting CD/DVD images (.ISO). After burning it with any writing application disk looks blank when inserted into normal CD/DVD reading device (though, when mounted with the CrossCrypt application the state does not change, files are accessed in a new virtual drive).

Encryption algorithms

The encryption algorithms supported by CrossCrypt include AES (256, 192, 128; SingleKey Mode aes-loop compatible) and TwoFish (160 Bit Key; SuSE Linux compatible).

See also

 LibreCrypt, a significantly more advanced disk encryption program
 Disk encryption
 Disk encryption software
 Comparison of disk encryption software

References

External links
 Official FileDisk website
 CrossCryptGUI

Cryptographic software
Windows-only free software